Sant Martí Vell is a village in the province of Girona and autonomous community of Catalonia, Spain.

Notable people
Elsa Peretti (1940–2021), fashion designer; lived in the village from 1968 until her death. She contributed to many projects in the village, including rebuilding, renovation of the local church, excavation of a Roman site, and the establishment of a vineyard.

References

External links
 Government data pages 

Municipalities in Gironès